Jonathan Mwe di Malila also known as Jonathan Malila, (born 1 April 1993 in Kinshasa, Democratic Republic of the Congo) is a congolese-born artist living and working in Cologne, Germany. His artwork tries to thematizise congolese everyday Culture, which he dubbed Congo Pop. He is a nephew of the congolese deputy minister of international relation and national integration Franck Mwe di Malila and is also a descendant of the Mwe di Malila family, among the most notable families in Kinshasa, Cabinda and Bas-Congo.
Mwe di, an honorable particule meaning Lord, derives from the Kikongo term Mwene, the title of the Lords and Nobility of the Kingdom of Kongo.

Childhood 
Jonathan Mwe di Malila belongs to the family of the congolese millionaire, football official and estate owner Édouard Mwe di Malila Apenela. 1998 he moved to Germany because of the instabile political situation. He went to primary school in Cologne and later to the private Erzbischöfliche Liebfrauenschule. After a couple of years he changed to the Humboldtgymnasium Cologne. In his youth he played, hockey, football and did athletics. 2008 he won the title of fasted student of cologne in a sprint competition in which every secondary school in Cologne participated. After he finished school, he worked for a finance consultant company, which was specialized in the contribution of financial products.

Congo Pop 

Jonathan Mwe di Malila uses strong, vibrant and unbroken colours. Inspired by Fauvism and Pop-Art he aims to counteract the fugacity of impressionistic paintings to give the artwork more duration. Many of his paintings include African or congolese elements, combined with everyday objects, subjects and situation to create a funny content. His main Medium is oil, which he often combines with acrylics or typically African fabrics, such as African wax prints. His art has no political intent, it just serves to uplift his heritage and bring his culture to people. Also, some of his art appears to be naive. These works partially depict childish and elementary vision of the artist and act as spontaneous expressions of himself. In his latest series, Jonathan Mwe di Malila was inspired by the "Gentlemen of Bacongo" or better known as Les Sapeurs. These men, based in Brazzaville,  are known for their dapper eye-catching clothing and have been inspirational to several artists and designer such as Solange Knowles for her music video "Losing You" and designer Paul Smith.
Mwe di Malila adapted the Sapeurs in his artwork and brought the subject with strong, unbroken and bright colours to canvas. He integrated African fabrics as his artistical interpretation. Since he is from Kinshasa, the other Congo State, he gave his series the name "Les Gens de coleur de Kinshasa", which means "The coloured people from Kinshasa". Jonalthan's  work has also been influenced by his favourite artist, Henri Matisse who is also known to be a representative of Fauvism.

Artistic process 
Jonathan Malila usually paints for a week in a stretch or for just a couple of hours in a day per session, depending on the scale or aim of the final piece. His work being the love-child of Fauvism and Pop-Art, Jonathan usually depicts the everyday goings and culture around him and then accentuates his work with bold, vibrant colours.

Television appearances 
2014: Mieten, kaufen, wohnen

Solo exhibitions 
2015: Galerie Smend, Cologne, Germany, "Congo-Pop! the Lovechild between Pop-Art and Fauvism"

References

External links 

Democratic Republic of the Congo artists
People from Kinshasa
1993 births
Living people
21st-century Democratic Republic of the Congo people